BYD Home Energy System, simplified as BYD HES, is an energy solution without any emission offered by the Chinese auto, battery, PV manufacturer BYD, integrating its internally developed components such as solar panel, Iron phosphate battery, inverter etc. Briefly speaking, this system generates electricity from solar power, and then stores it for whole day’s family energy use, realizing a non-contamination, non-emission life style. In addition, BYD’s pronounced its customization service for different demands from consumers/clients.

Another significant function of BYD HES is the possibility of electric power feedback to the Grid when necessary.

BYD HES has ever made its appearance several times during professional symposiums like Intersolar Europe, Solar Power International etc. and started its sales in Japan and some other regions, but no more official confirmation for its details of parameters could be reached from reliable sources.

References 

BYD Company
Energy storage